The 1916–17 İstanbul Football League season was the 12th season of the league. Altınordu İdman Yurdu SK won the league for the first time. NB: 3-2-1 point system.

Season

Matches

Fenerbahçe SK - Küçükçekmece SK: 0-1
Altınordu İdman Yurdu SK - Fenerbahçe SK : 1-1
Fenerbahçe SK - Anadolu Üsküdar 1908 SK: 7-0
Fenerbahçe SK - Anadolu Hisarı İdman Yurdu SK: 1-1
Fenerbahçe SK - Galatasaray: 4-1 
Küçükçekmece SK - Fenerbahçe SK: 2-1
Fenerbahçe SK - Altınordu İdman Yurdu SK: 1-3
Anadolu Üsküdar 1908 SK - Fenerbahçe SK: 2-1
Galatasaray - Fenerbahçe SK: 2-3

Anadolu Hisarı İdman Yurdu SK left the league in the second half of the season.

References
 Dağlaroğlu, Rüştü. Fenerbahçe Spor Kulübü Tarihi 1907-1957

Istanbul Football League seasons
Istanbul
Istanbul